Michelle F. Brownlee is a politician from the U.S. commonwealth of Pennsylvania. A member of the Democratic Party, she was a member of the Pennsylvania House of Representatives for the 195th district until her resignation after pleading guilty to felony conflict of interest charges on June 8, 2015.

References

External links

Living people
Democratic Party members of the Pennsylvania House of Representatives
African-American state legislators in Pennsylvania
Pennsylvania politicians convicted of crimes
21st-century American politicians
American female criminals
21st-century American criminals
Year of birth missing (living people)
21st-century African-American politicians
21st-century African-American women